India–United Arab Emirates relations are the bilateral relations that exist between the Republic of India and the United Arab Emirates. They are both in I2U2 Group. Indians also make up the largest ethnic group in the UAE, making up roughly 38% of UAE's total residents. India is UAE's largest exports destination & trading partner with bilateral trade turnover of US$ 68.4 billion during the calendar year 2021. UAE's exports to India stood at US$ 43.04 billion while India's exports to UAE stood at US$ 25.4 billion. In 2022 India & UAE signed a Comprehensive Economic Partnership Agreement (CEPA) with an aim of taking bilateral trade to US$ 100 billion within 5 years.

Country comparison

History

Early years 
Since 3000 B.C, relations between India and the seven emirates which now make up the United Arab Emirates were traditionally close. The UAE and India had enjoyed close and friendly ties based on historic and cultural ties. People-to-people contacts and barter trade for clothes and spices from India in exchange for dates and pearls from the region have existed for centuries. After the creation of the Federation in 1971, India-UAE relations flourished. 

Today UAE and India share political, economical, and cultural links. There are over a million Indians in the United Arab Emirates, being by far the largest migrant group in the country.

21st century 

On 16 August 2015, Prime Minister Narendra Modi began a two-day visit to the UAE, the first state visit by an Indian Prime Minister to the country in 34 years. In 2018, a Memorandum of Understanding (MoU) was signed between India and the UAE on Technical Cooperation in the Rail Sector. It provided a platform for Indian Railways to interact and share their latest developments and knowledge in the railway sector. On 18 August 2018, Modi described Sheikh Mohammed's humanitarian support for those affected by the Kerala floods that year as "[reflecting] the special ties between governments and people of India and UAE". On 6 August 2019, the UAE backed the decision of the Indian government to pursue passage of the 2019 Jammu and Kashmir Reorganisation Bill, with the UAE's Ambassador to India stating: "We expect that the changes would improve social justice and security and confidence of the people in the local governance and will encourage further stability and peace."

In August, 2021, UAE and India signed an agreement under which faculty members from Indian universities will spend six to 10 months every year for undertaking research and teaching social sciences in Abu Dhabi. This agreement was aimed at deepening the academic and cultural ties between the two nations.

Economic relations
The UAE is India's top trading partner in entire West Asia and North Africa region. According to journalist Ravi S. Jha, Indian exports to the UAE account for 6% of India's global exports. In 2008–09, India emerged as the largest trade partner of the UAE with bilateral trade between the two countries exceeding $44.5 billion. In 2018–19, India-UAE bilateral trade grew by over 20% and India's exports to UAE grew by 7% whereas the UAE's exports to India surged by 37% to reach US$29.78 billion.

Though India and the UAE are two fast-growing economies from Asia, bilateral trade between them has not kept pace with the economic growth in the region, with trade falling to US$49.3 billion in 2016 from about US$67 billion in 2013. So, during the Indian PM Narendra Modi's visit to the UAE in February 2018, both sides signed a landmark agreement to conduct trade directly in their local currencies eliminating the need for US dollars which would significantly boost trade. Both leaders have also set an ambitious target of US$100 billion in bilateral trade by the year 2020.

An underwater rail tunnel linking the UAE with the western coast of India was proposed in 2018. The proposed tunnel would be supported by pontoons and be nearly 2000 kilometres in length.

In the financial year 2018–19, India-UAE bilateral trade grew by over 20% to reach US$59.9 billion. India's exports to UAE grew by 7% to US$30.13 billion whereas UAE's exports to India surged by 37% to reach US$29.78 billion.

India had a four-story pavilion at Dubai Expo 2020 showcasing business opportunities and its global push towards attracting investors for its projected $5 trillion economy. The pavilion, one of the largest among 190 countries, featured Indian brands and multinational companies, including Reliance Industries and Adani Group. The Comprehensive Economic Partnership Agreement being negotiated with the UAE was expected to help in sealing at least $100 billion trade. India's rising unicorns and startups were a major attraction for global investors, and at least 13 states participated at the Dubai Expo.

Security Relations 
Since 2014, India has worked with UAE on various counter-terrorism issues.

On 4 March 2018, the Indian Coast Guard and Emirati special forces collaborated in a successful operation, requested by Emirati Prime Minister Sheikh Mohammed bin Rashid Al Maktoum, and approved by Indian Prime Minister Narendra Modi, to intercept a yacht carrying Latifa bint Mohammed Al Maktoum.

In December 2020, Indian authorities in coordination with UAE had foiled a Pakistani ISI backed-terrorist attack in Delhi. The arrested terrorists consisted of  2 Khalistani and 3 Hizbul Mujahideen members. The head of the cell was arrested in UAE and deported to India.

Cultural Relations 

In 1975, UAE and India signed an agreement to deepen their cultural ties. Both countries agreed to cooperate in art, culture, and education, including academic activity in science and technology, sports, public health and mass media.

There are currently over 3 million Indians living in UAE. Immigration has been highly active since the 1960s. Most of the people who migrated are from the southern states of India. Since 2014, both countries have signed multiple agreements and have increased their cooperation in various fields. Diplomats have emphasized the bonhomie between PM Narendra Modi and President Sheikh Mohamed Bin Zayed Al Nahyan for close cooperation between the countries. In a joint statement given in February 2022, there was a proposal to establish the first overseas IIT.

References

 
United Arab Emirates
Bilateral relations of the United Arab Emirates